Arnaud d'Aux (1260/70 – August 1320) was a relative of pope Clement V, who named him bishop of Poitiers (November 1306), and then cardinal-bishop of Albano (23 December 1312). He accompanied cardinal Arnaud Nouvel in England in 1312. He acted also as Camerlengo of the Holy Roman Church from 1311 until 1319. He participated in the papal conclave, 1314-1316 and died at Avignon.

External links

13th-century births
1320 deaths
14th-century French cardinals
Cardinal-nephews
Year of birth uncertain
Camerlengos of the Holy Roman Church